Strathcona was a stern-wheel steamboat.
Not much is known of this steamer. She was built in 1900 to work for the Hudson's Bay Company and did service between Port Essington to Hazelton on the Skeena River. But she only did this trip once and retired from the Hudson Bay Company.

The steamer also helped do the service on the Sidney and Nanaimo ferry route starting on June 24, 1902 replacing the Iroquois. This service was called the Sidney and Nanaimo Transportation Company. The service also made stops in the Gulf Islands. Strathcona had worked for three months of that year before she blew a cylinder on August 19, 1902. The ship was unable to be repaired, so she was retired from S&NT immediately and replaced.

The stern-wheeler's true end is unknown. She was beached and stripped on one of the Gulf Islands.

References 
 http://www.sidneymuseum.ca/history-shipping-ferries.html
 http://www.riverboatdays.ca/exhibit4.php

Strathcona
1900 ships
Hudson's Bay Company ships
Steamboats of the Skeena River